Exaeretia nechlys is a moth in the family Depressariidae. It is found in North America, where it has been recorded from Arizona to California and in Nevada.

The larvae feed on Sidalcea malviflora, Malva, Malacothamnus jonesii and Sphaeralcea species.

References

Moths described in 1974
Exaeretia
Moths of North America